Enamel may refer to:

Decorative arts
 Vitreous enamel, a smooth, durable coating for metal, made of melted and fused glass powder
 Enamelled glass, glass which has been decorated with vitreous enamel
 Overglaze enamelling, painting on top of glaze in pottery

Dentistry
 Tooth enamel, the hard mineralised surface of teeth
 Enamel organ, a cellular aggregation in a developing tooth that is responsible for the formation of enamel

Industrial products
 Enamel paint, commercial paint that dries to an especially hard glossy finish
 Enameled wire, wire insulated with a hard polymer coating

See also